William Keith Harvey (25 December 1934 – October 2018) was an English professional footballer who played as a centre half.

Career
Born in Crediton, Harvey played for Crediton United and Exeter City, before becoming a coach at Exeter City.

References

1934 births
2018 deaths
English footballers
Crediton United A.F.C. players
Exeter City F.C. players
English Football League players
Association football defenders
People from Crediton
Exeter City F.C. non-playing staff